Bani Taratom (also romanized as Banī Tarātom and Banī Terātom; also known as Banūtarātom) is a village in Qaleh Ganj Rural District, in the Central District of Qaleh Ganj County, Kerman Province, Iran. At the 2006 census, its population was 263, in 50 families.

References 

Populated places in Qaleh Ganj County